Ilsbo is a locality situated in Nordanstig Municipality, Gävleborg County, Sweden with 406 inhabitants in 2010.

Sports
The following sports clubs are located in Ilsbo:

 Ilsbo SK

References 

Populated places in Nordanstig Municipality
Hälsingland